On 22 July 2011 at 03:43 Beijing Time (20:00 UTC on the 21st), a bus fire occurred in Xinyang, Henan, causing the deaths of 41 people and injuring 6 others.

Fire 
The fire occurred on China National Highway 105, which links Beijing to Zhuhai, Guangdong. At 3:43 am, a fire started at the rear of the bus, rapidly consuming the bus. Upon noticing the explosion, the driver immediately pulled over to the left and stopped in 145 meters. Some of the survivors reported hearing an explosion at the back of the vehicle when the fire started. Six people, including the driver, survived and were hospitalized. As a result of the fire, the vehicle was severely damaged.

Investigation 
The investigation concluded that the vehicle was illegally carrying 15 boxes of Azobisisobutyronitrile, each weighing 20 kg.It was found that at Weihai, the starting point of the route, Huichang Company worker Zhang Hui (deceased) loaded the 10 boxes on to the bus, first into the luggage area then later moved into locked toilet with another 5 loaded on later, beside the toilet, and due to the improper packaging, the motion of the vehicle and the heat generated from the engine caused it to decompose and combust. According to the 'Safe management of dangerous chemicals', Zhang Hui should've used a refrigerator truck, instead deliberately transporting it on a public transport vehicle despite the contract stipulating the use of a refrigerated transport.

Aftermath 
As a result of the investigation, 10 people involved with Weihai Transport Company, the manufacturer of the chemical and the contracted transporter company were arrested.

See also
Chengdu bus fire
Xiamen bus fire

References

External links
 京珠高速客车起火案 on Baidu Baike

Fires in China
2011 fires in Asia
2011 disasters in China
Bus incidents in China
2011 road incidents
History of Henan
July 2011 events in China